Veerapandiya Kattabomman was an 18th-century Palayakarrar and king of Panchalankurichi in Tamil Nadu, India. He refused to accept the sovereignty of the British East India Company and waged a war against them. He was captured by the British with the help of the ruler of the kingdom of Pudukottai, Vijaya Raghunatha Tondaiman, and at the age of 39 he was hanged at Kayathar on 16 October 1799.

Early life 
He was a Vatuka (northerner), a loose term for a group of Telugu-speaking castes which includes families who claim to have moved south to settle in the arid Tirunelveli region after the collapse of the Nayaka-controlled Vijayanagara Empire in 1565. They had previously had some prominence in the imperial court and may have been adept at farming in dry conditions, although it is also possible that they had no choice but to settle where they did because the other significant community of Tirunelveli – the Maravars – had already occupied the more favourable areas. Kattabomman was a member of the Rajakambalam Nayakkar caste who are shepherds, with the other two Vadugan communities being the Kammavars and the Reddies.

Legacy

The historian Susan Bayly says that Kattabomman is considered a Robin Hood-like figure in local folklore and is the subject of several traditional narrative ballads in the kummi verse form. The site of his execution at Kayathar has become a "powerful local shrine" and at one time sheep were sacrificed there. The Government of Tamil Nadu maintains a memorial at Kayathar and the remnants of the old fort at Panchalankurichi is protected by the Archaeological Survey of India. In 2006, the Tirunelveli district administration organised a festival at Panchalankurichi on his birth anniversary.

The Tamil-language film Veerapandiya Kattabomman, starring Sivaji Ganesan, is based on his life.

To commemorate the bicentenary of Kattabomman's hanging, the Government of India released a postal stamp in his honour on 16 October 1999. The Indian Navy communications centre at Vijayanarayanam is named INS Kattabomman.

See also
Puli Thevar
Dheeran Chinnamalai
Maruthu Pandiyar
Veeran Sundaralingam
Oomaithurai, Veerapandiya Kattabomman's younger brother
Rani Velu Nachiar

Further reading

References

1761 births
1799 deaths
Indian revolutionaries
People executed by British India by hanging
Executed Indian people
People from Tirunelveli district
Polygar Wars